Karen Boccalero (May 19, 1933 – June 24, 1997) was an American nun, fine artist, and founder and former director of Self-Help Graphics & Art.

Early life and education 
Carmen Rose Boccalero was born in Globe, Arizona, to Albert Boccalero and Annie Guadagnoli; both her parents were of Italian descent. She moved to Los Angeles with her family as a child. She attended Immaculate Heart College in Los Feliz, California, where she studied with Sister Corita Kent. Boccalero pursued further art education at the Tyler School of Art abroad in Rome, Italy, and earned an MFA as a printmaker at Temple University.

Career 
Boccalero founded and named Self-Help Graphics in Boyle Heights in 1971, with a group of Chicano artists.  She had acquired a printing press and started a workshop in a garage rented by her order, the Sisters of St. Francis of Penance and Christian Charity.  Self-Help Graphics was both a print studio and a community center, with Sister Karen as its longtime director.  She worked to highlight Mexican cultural elements in much of the studio's output, and in the educational programs that they undertook. She was instrumental in organizing the first Dia de los Muertos celebration in Los Angeles. "Sister Karen was very adamant about including Mesoamerican and Mexican iconography and history in teaching young people in East L. A.," noted instructor Linda Vallejo.

Boccalero was a persuasive fundraiser for the program. Her training as an artist informed her work supporting emerging artists.  She considered the studio her mission, as a Franciscan nun, and her order recognized it as such, even while she was supporting Willie Herrón in bringing East Los Angeles punkero bands to perform regularly in the studio. In 1988, Boccalero won a Vesta Award from the Woman's Building, for her work in arts community support.

Boccalero lived to see Self-Help Graphics featured in a major exhibit at Laguna Art Museum in 1995.

Personal life and legacy 
Boccalero wore modest informal secular clothing, not a religious habit. "She dedicated herself as a bride of Christ, but she was also a progressive, chain-smoking, cussing nun," remembered colleague Tomas Benitez.

Karen Boccalero died in 1997, at age 64 of a heart attack. A traditional altar was erected in her memory, covered in artworks, photos, cigarette boxes, and marigolds.   There was a tribute exhibit to Sister Karen on the tenth anniversary of her death, at Self Help Graphics & Art.   Posters by Boccalero and other artists from her community were part of the "American Sabor" exhibit at Bob Bullock Museum in 2010.  Work by Sister Karen was also featured in "Now Dig This! Art and Black Los Angeles, 1960–1980," a 2011–2013 traveling show organized by the Hammer Museum in Los Angeles.

Galería Sin Fronteras in Austin, Texas began with inspiration from the work of Karen Boccalero. Self-Help Graphics & Art continues as a community institution in East Los Angeles.

References

External links 
 Self-Help Graphics & Art

1933 births
1997 deaths
People from Globe, Arizona
Temple University Tyler School of Art alumni
Artists from Arizona
20th-century American Roman Catholic nuns
Artists from Los Angeles
American people of Italian descent
20th-century American women artists
20th-century American printmakers
People from East Los Angeles, California
Catholics from California
Catholics from Arizona
Nuns and art
American women printmakers